is an overhead vehicular combat game released by Sega for arcades in 1986. It was ported to the Master System the same year, and then to the Amiga, Amstrad CPC, Atari ST, Commodore 64, ZX Spectrum and IBM PC compatible computers.

The player begins the game riding a superbike. In subsequent levels a sports car, a jet via added wings, jetski, helicopter and Formula One racing car can all be driven, as seen in the game's title screen. All of the vehicles are armed to deal with enemy vehicles and gun emplacements. The helicopter levels play as a vertically scrolling shooter.

Gameplay

Development

Release

In 2022, the original arcade version was included as part of the Sega Astro City Mini V, a vertically-oriented variant of the Sega Astro City mini console.

Reception

In Japan, Game Machine listed Action Fighter on their October 15, 1986 issue as being the twelfth most-successful table arcade unit of the month.

Computer and Video Games magazine reviewed the Sega Master System version in 1989, giving it an 89% score.

References

External links

Action Fighter at Arcade history
Action Fighter at Lemon Amiga

Action Fighter at Atari Mania

Amiga games
Amstrad CPC games
Atari ST games
Commodore 64 games
DOS games
Sega video games
Master System games
Vehicular combat games
ZX Spectrum games
Sega arcade games
1986 video games
Multiplayer and single-player video games
Video games developed in Japan